John de Sècheville (or John de Sicca Villa) (died 1302) was a philosopher in the thirteenth century; his most famous work was his "De Principiis Naturae".

He was English, of noble stock, and lived the majority of his life in England. Information about his life is scant; it isn't known when he was born, though, he was still alive in 1292 (when John Peckham, Archbishop of Canterbury died).

By 1245, he was already ordained, a Master of Arts and appointed to the Living of Pilham by the Duke of Cornwall. A little later, he is first recorded at the University of Paris, where in 1256 he became the Vice-Chancellor of Faculty of Arts. Matthew Paris records that John de Sècheville was important within the University and well-respected as an eminent philosopher and scientist.

He was a Canon at Glasney in Cornwall till December 1271, when he was appointed to a Prebend at Crediton. His final appointment appears to have been as Prior of St Neots in 1292, dying in 1302.

Notes

Scholastic philosophers
English Benedictines
1302 deaths
English philosophers
Year of birth unknown
English male non-fiction writers
13th-century philosophers